Anton Joachimsthaler (born 1930 in Hohenelbe) is a German historian. He is particularly noted for his research on the early life of the German dictator Adolf Hitler, in his book Korrektur einer Biografie ("Correction of a Biography") and his last days in the book Hitlers Ende ("Hitler's End"), published in English as The Last Days of Hitler.

Life 
Joachimsthaler was born in 1930 in Hohenelbe in the Sudetenland.  He studied electrical engineering at the Oskar-von-Miller-Polytechnikum, a predecessor of the Munich University of Applied Sciences. Afterwards he worked in 1956 for the Deutsche Bundesbahn (German Federal Railroad) as a mechanical and electrical engineer in various places, his last position being as a senior service manager in the Munich-Freimann repair station. Since 1969 he has occupied himself with contemporary and railroad history.

Since the 1970s, he has produced publications on the history of technology and general history, and has contributed to television broadcasts from ZDF Mainz, such as Hitler as a private man. His work Korrektur einer Biografie ("Correction of a Biography"), in which he made many facts about Hitler's early years known to a broader public, was particularly well received, and his book Hitlers Ende ("Hitler's End"), which was published in English as The Last Days of Hitler: Legend, Evidence and Truth, is often cited.

Scholarly contributions
Joachimsthaler is best known for his contributions to the study of the life of Adolf Hitler. He is a researcher who has made important contributions over the last decades to revision of Hitler's early years of life in Linz, Vienna and Munich. Historian Richard J. Evans singled out Joachimsthaler for his "notable... minutely detailed and critical account of the evidence relating to the Nazi leader's early life." He helped to counter the view, expressed by other historians, that the young Hitler was an established anti-semite in the period before the World War I, by highlighting convincing evidence that Hitler developed into a serious anti-semite only during or immediately after the war. This he ascertained from his research in the city archives of Hitler's hometown, Linz. Also, the fact that Stefanie Rabatsch, with whom Hitler, according to his boyhood friend August Kubizek, had developed a fanatical youthful love, had the maiden name of "Isak". The fact that Hitler had a romantic interest in a girl whom he believed due to her Jewish-sounding name to be Jewish, although in fact she was not, made a serious anti-Semitic attitude of the later dictator highly unlikely at that time.

His first study, published in 1981, is still the standard work.

According to historian Ian Kershaw, Joachimsthaler's work The Last Days of Hitler: The Legends, The Evidence, The Truth is a "meticulous study of the testimony and forensic evidence" as to Hitler's last days and death. In addition Kershaw wrote that Joachimsthaler's book in chapters 5–7 were "the most reliable and detailed examination" of the cremation of Hitler and Eva Braun. Joachimsthaler held a view similar to one published by U.S. jurist Michael Musmanno 45 years earlier that Hitler's body was burnt to near-ashes and thus never found by the Soviets. Joachimsthaler correctly concluded that only Hitler's dental remains are known to have been found by the Soviets, positing that they were sifted from the soil. Dutch historian Sjoerd J. de Boer wrote that Joachimsthaler was one of the historians to put many myths in relation to Hitler to rest. Specifically as to Joachimsthaler's book Hitlers Ende, de Boer wrote that all the witnesses and evidence in relation to Hitler's last days was "dealt with exhaustively". Further, that the book was important in reaction to the years of rumor and speculation as to the dictator's death.

Publications
As author:

In German
 Entwicklungsgeschichte der elektrischen Lokomotiven ("History of development of electric locomotives") in 100 Jahre elektrische Eisenbahn ("100 years of electric railway"). Starnberg: Keller Verlag, 1980, Page 22ff.
 Bundesbahn-Ausbesserungswerk München-Freimann. Geschichte, Menschen, Fahrzeuge 1925–1985 ("Munich-Freimann Federal Railroad Repair Center. History, people, vehicles 1925-1985"). Munchen: Bundesbahn-Ausbesserungswerk München-Freimann,1985.
 Die Breitspurbahn: Das Projekt zur Erschließung des groß-europäischen Raumes 1942–1945 ("The Broad railway: The project for the development of the Greater European region 1942-1945"). München: Verlag Herbig, 1985. .
 Korrektur einer Biografie. Adolf Hitler 1908–1920 ("Correction of a biography. Adolf Hitler 1908-1920"). München: Verlag Herbig, 1989. 
 Hitlers Weg begann in München. 1913–1923 ("Hitler's path began in Munich. 1913-1923"). München: Verlag Herbig, 2000,  (überarbeitete Fassung von „Korrektur einer Biografie“; Foreword by  Ian Kershaw).
 Hitlers Liste. Ein Dokument persönlicher Beziehungen ("Hitler's list. A document of personal relationships"). München, Verlag Harbig,  2003. 
 Hitlers Ende ("Hitler's end"). München: F.A. Herbig Verlagsbuchhandlung, 2004.
 München – Hauptstadt der Bewegung ("Munich - capital of the movement"). München
Catalog of the Munich city museum

As publisher:
 Christa Schroeder: Er war mein Chef ("He was my boss"). Munich 1985 
Memoirs of one of Hitler's secretaries

In English

References

Citations

Bibliography

External links 
 

1930 births
Railway historians
20th-century German historians
Living people
21st-century German historians